Eric Leroy Adams (born September 1, 1960) is an American politician and former police officer, serving as the 110th mayor of New York City since January 1, 2022. Adams was an officer in the New York City Transit Police and then the New York City Police Department for more than 20 years, retiring at the rank of captain. He served in the New York State Senate from 2006 to 2013, representing the 20th Senate district in Brooklyn. In November 2013, Adams was elected Brooklyn Borough President, the first African-American to hold the position, and reelected in November 2017.

On November 17, 2020, Adams announced his candidacy for mayor of New York City. On July 6, 2021, the Associated Press declared Adams the winner of the 2021 Democratic mayoral primary. Adams defeated Republican Curtis Sliwa in the general election in a landslide victory. Adams was sworn in as mayor shortly after midnight on January 1, 2022. As mayor, he has taken what is seen as a tough-on-crime approach and reintroduced a plain-clothed unit of police officers that had been disbanded by the previous administration. In efforts to improve the city's standards of living, he has implemented a zero-tolerance policy on homeless people sleeping in subway cars alongside increased police presence.

Early life and education 
Adams was born in Brownsville, Brooklyn, on September 1, 1960. His mother, Dorothy Mae Adams-Streeter (1938-2021),  worked double shifts as a housecleaner and had received only a third-grade education. His father was a butcher who struggled with alcohol abuse. Both of his parents moved to New York City from Alabama in the 1950s. Adams was raised in a rat-infested tenement in Bushwick, Brooklyn, and his family was so poor that he often brought a bag of clothes to school with him in case of a sudden eviction from his home. By 1968, his mother managed to save up enough money to buy a house and move the family to South Jamaica, Queens. He was the fourth of six children and as a young boy he sometimes earned money as a squeegee boy.

At age 14, Adams joined a gang, the 7-Crowns, and became known as "a tough little guy". He would hold money for local hustlers. He also ran errands, including purchasing groceries, for a dancer and part-time prostitute named Micki after she became injured. After Micki refused to pay for the groceries he purchased or the work he had done, Adams and his brother stole her TV and a money order. The two were later arrested for criminal trespassing. While in police custody, they were beaten by NYPD officers until a black cop intervened. Adams was sent to a juvenile detention center for a few days before being sentenced to probation. Adams had post-traumatic stress disorder after the incident, and has said that the violent encounter motivated him to enter law enforcement. He was particularly intrigued by the black police officer and by the swagger and respect that comes with being in law enforcement. A local pastor of The House of the Lord Pentecostal Church added to his motivation when he suggested that by joining the police force, he could aid in reforming police culture from within. Adams would later attend his church often.

Adams graduated from Bayside High School in Queens in 1978, but struggled to maintain good grades. He began attending college while working as a mechanic and a mailroom clerk at the Brooklyn District Attorney's office, receiving an associate degree from the New York City College of Technology, a bachelor's degree from the John Jay College of Criminal Justice, and an M.P.A. from Marist College. Adams experienced an academic turnaround that he credits to a dyslexia diagnosis in college: "I went from a D student to the dean's list."

Policing career 
Adams served as an officer in the New York City Transit Police and in the New York City Police Department (NYPD) for 22 years. He has described his wanting to serve as a reaction to the abuse he suffered by NYPD in his youth and separately stated that he was encouraged to join to lead reform from within. He attended the New York City Police Academy and graduated second in his class in 1984.

Adams started in the New York City Transit Police, and continued with the NYPD when the transit police and the NYPD merged. He worked in the 6th Precinct in Greenwich Village, the 94th Precinct in Greenpoint, and the 88th Precinct covering Fort Greene and Clinton Hill. In 1986, white police officers raised their guns at Adams when he was working as a plainclothes officer; he was mistaken for a suspect. During the 1990s, Adams served as president of the Grand Council of Guardians, an African American patrolmen's association.

Adams worked with the Nation of Islam in the 1990s because of their work in patrolling crime-ridden housing projects. Adams met with their leader Louis Farrakhan and appeared on stage with him at an event. Adams also suggested that Mayor David Dinkins meet with Farrakhan and hire the Nation of Islam's security company to patrol housing projects. Adams's ties to Farrakhan—who has made antisemitic comments—received criticism in the New York Post.

In 1995, Adams served as an escort for Mike Tyson when he was released from jail following his rape conviction. That same year, in response to the election of Rudy Giuliani as Mayor, he co-founded 100 Blacks in Law Enforcement Who Care, an advocacy group for black police officers that sought criminal justice reform and often spoke out against police brutality and racial profiling. The group also held tutorials that taught black male youth how to deal with the police if they are detained, which included turning on the car's dome light, putting their hands on the wheel and deescalating the situation. However, many activists, including Al Sharpton, criticized Adams's efforts, claiming that he was merely teaching young black people how to "live under oppression."

In 1999, Adams said on race in policing:

Adams was a first responder at the World Trade Center site during the aftermath of the September 11 attacks. He arrived at Ground Zero during the evening of September 11 and was in charge of leading a group of police officers to secure the site in the event of a second attack.

In 2006, Adams was put under surveillance and investigated by the NYPD for appearing on television in his official capacity as a police officer and critiquing Mayor Michael Bloomberg. He retired with the rank of captain from the police force in 2006.

Early political career 
In the 1990s, Adams began to eye a political career, with the ultimate goal to become the Mayor of New York City. He spoke to William Lynch Jr., who was an advisor to Mayor David Dinkins, about a political career. Lynch encouraged Adams to first obtain a bachelor's degree, rise within the NYPD's ranks and successfully run for a lower political office.

During the 1993 mayoral election, Adams, a supporter of the incumbent candidate for mayor, David Dinkins, made a controversial comment about a candidate for New York State Comptroller, Herman Badillo. Adams said that if Badillo—who was Puerto Rican—were concerned about the Hispanic community, he would have married a Hispanic woman and not a white Jewish woman. These comments became a point of turmoil in the election and caused controversy for Dinkins who ultimately lost the election.

In 1994, Adams ran for Congress against incumbent Major Owens in the Democratic primary for New York's 11th congressional district, condemning Owens for denouncing Louis Farrakhan but failed to receive enough valid signatures to make the ballot. Adams claimed his petition signatures had been stolen by someone on behalf of Owens, but police found no evidence of any such thing.

Adams registered as a Republican in 1997, before switching back to the Democratic Party in 2001, according to the Board of Elections. Adams has said his switch to the Republican Party was a protest move against what he saw as failed Democratic leadership.

New York State Senate (2007–2013)
In 2006, Adams ran for the New York State Senate. He was elected and served four terms until 2013, when he was elected Brooklyn Borough President. He represented the 20th Senate District, which includes parts of the Brooklyn neighborhoods of Brownsville, Crown Heights, East Flatbush, Park Slope, Prospect Heights, and Sunset Park.

Adams was known for being a rabble rouser in the State Senate, who could capture the attention of the media. He would often flaunt his convertible BMW, and he placed billboards around parts of Brooklyn bemoaning pants sagging. He also published an instructional video to teach parents how to search their child's room for contraband. In the demonstration, Adams finds a crack pipe in a backpack, bullets behind a picture frame and marijuana secreted inside of a doll. As a freshman state senator, he joined other legislators requesting a pay raise for New York's lawmakers, who had not received a raise since 1999. At the time, they ranked third-highest in pay among state lawmakers in the United States. During his speech on the floor supporting a pay raise for legislators, he lamented "show me the money."

In 2009, two New York State Senate Democrats aligned with Republicans, creating a standoff over who would be the Senate's next leader. It was Adams who worked to foster a compromise to nominate John L. Sampson as the Minority Leader of the New York State Senate. That same year, Adams was one of the 24 state senators to vote in favor of marriage equality in New York State. He spoke in support of the freedom to marry during the debate before the vote. When the bill failed to become law, he again voted to legalize same-sex marriage in New York in 2011. On July 24, 2011, New York's Marriage Equality Act came into effect.

In 2010, Adams became Chair of the Senate Racing and Wagering Committee and was praised for his engagement in this position. He would spend hours traveling and visiting racetracks to further study the issue. He came under investigation for his handling of choosing an operator to run the gambling operation at the Aqueduct Racetrack in Queens. A report conducted by the state inspector general was critical of Adams' judgment as he leaked information on the bidding process, fundraised from potential bidders and attended the victory celebration of the company that was awarded the contract. The matter was referred to the United States Department of Justice, but they took no action and Adams maintained no wrongdoing calling the report a "political hit piece." In February 2010, Adams was one of just eight members of the New York Senate who voted not to expel Senator Hiram Monserrate from the legislature after he was convicted of assault for dragging his girlfriend down a hallway and slashing her face with a piece of glass.

Adams was a vocal opponent of the NYPD's "stop and frisk" policy, which predominantly affected young black and Latino men, and which in 2000 the U.S. Commission on Civil Rights said constituted racial profiling. In 2011, he supported calling for a federal investigation into stop-and-frisk practices. He championed a bill to stop the NYPD from gathering data about individuals who had been stopped but not charged.

In 2012, Adams served as co-chair of New York's State Legislators Against Illegal Guns. Adams and five other state lawmakers wore hooded sweatshirts in the legislative chamber on March 12, 2012, in protest of the shooting of Trayvon Martin, a Florida teen who was killed by another civilian, George Zimmerman.

Brooklyn Borough President (2013–2021)

On November 5, 2013, Adams was elected Brooklyn Borough President with 90.8 percent of the vote, more than any other candidate for borough president in New York City that year. In 2017, he was elected with 83.0 percent of the vote. In both of his campaigns, he was unopposed in the Democratic primaries.

Community boards 
Adams, in his role as Brooklyn Borough President, appointed the members of each of the 18 community boards in Brooklyn, half of which are nominated by local members of the New York City Council. Community board members represent their neighbors in matters dealing with land use and other specific neighborhood needs.

In 2016, Adams launched a mobile app that could be used as a paperless alternative to applying for a position on one of Brooklyn's community boards. Applications increased by 10 percent.

Land use 
Under the New York City Charter, borough presidents must submit Uniform Land Use Review Procedure (ULURP) recommendations on certain uses of land throughout their borough. Adams used his ULURP recommendations to propose additional permanently affordable housing units in the rezoning of East New York; the relocation of municipal government agencies to East New York to reduce density in Downtown Brooklyn and create jobs for community residents; and the redevelopment of 25 Kent Avenue in Williamsburg as manufacturing space, with increased property taxes directed to the acquisition of the remaining proposed sections of Bushwick Inlet Park and their development as a community resource.

Adams has encouraged New York City to build affordable housing on municipally-owned properties such as the Brownsville Community Justice Center, over railyards and railways, and on space now used for parking lots.

Adams created the Faith-Based Property Development Initiative, which supports religious institutions that want to develop property for the benefit of the community, such as affordable housing and space for community activities.

In September 2017, Adams unveiled his recommendations for the future of the Bedford Union Armory in Crown Heights. His recommendation was to disapprove the application with conditions while calling for the inclusion of a greater amount of affordable housing on-site. The Bedford Union Armory proposals would contain recreational facilities, spaces for local non-profits, and two new residential buildings, including a condominium building along President Street in place of the Armory's stables.

In July 2018, Adams announced a joint $10-million, 19-plaintiff lawsuit with the Housing Rights Initiative (HRI) filed in Kings County Supreme Court. It stemmed from a comprehensive investigation by HRI that found that New York City real estate developer Kushner Companies engaged in illegal construction practices in a 338-unit building (formerly the Austin, Nichols and Company Warehouse), located at 184 Kent Avenue in Williamsburg. According to independent research, families, including children and babies, were exposed to highly toxic and cancer-causing substances, including, but not limited to, the lung carcinogen crystalline silica and lead.

Also in July 2018, Adams urged the developer involved in the Kensington Stables site in Windsor Terrace to help preserve the stables as part of a new proposal for the site.

Education 
In partnership with Medgar Evers College, Adams created the Brooklyn Pipeline, which provides developmental learning and enrichment opportunities to public school students in Brooklyn, teaches parents to better support their children's education, and facilitates professional development training to teachers and school leaders.

He wrote an editorial in The New York Daily News calling on the New York City Department of Education (DOE) to test all pre-Kindergarten students for gifted and talented programs, including African-American and Latino children who have historically been excluded.

Adams entered Brooklyn into the "Hour of Code" challenge with Chicago Public Schools. This challenge was designed to improve the computer skills of students. Brooklyn students were victorious, with more than 80 percent of the district schools throughout Brooklyn participating in the program.

Based on a report prepared by the Independent Budget Office of New York City (IBO) at his request, Adams urged the City University of New York (CUNY) system to explore reinstating free tuition for two-year community colleges, which could improve graduation rates and lead to increased earnings potential and taxpayer contribution, as well as expand access to higher education.

He has advocated for making two-year CUNY colleges free.

Adams is a supporter of Orthodox Jewish Yeshivas, which have faced accusations of failing to properly educate students when it comes to secular subjects. On Yeshivas Adams has said, "Children have a right to receive the best education, and not all communities, and not all parents take the same approach..." He has suggested appointing community ambassadors to serve as intermediaries between Yeshivas and City Hall.

Foreign affairs
Adams has described himself as "not a domesticated leader, [but] a global leader." Under the title of Borough President, Adams has traveled extensively throughout the world including to Senegal, Turkey and Cuba. He created at least five sister city agreements between Brooklyn and cities in other countries that he visited.

As Borough President, Adams traveled to China seven times. He allocated $2 million towards a plan to build a 40-foot friendship archway in the Chinese neighborhood of Sunset Park, Brooklyn, but the Chinese government ended up rescinding gifting the archway and the deal fell through.

Israel
Adams is a supporter of Israel. He has visited Israel multiple times, including leading a 2016 delegation focused on public safety and economic development between the US and Israel. He opposes the Boycott, Divestment and Sanctions (BDS) movement.

Health 

Adams launched the Family Friendly Brooklyn initiative by creating a lactation room in Brooklyn Borough Hall, with open access to the public. He introduced a bill in the New York City Council that would require all municipal buildings providing services to the public to have lactation rooms. The bill was passed by the City Council on July 14, 2016. In July 2018, Adams publicly denounced President Trump's efforts to stop Ecuador from passing a U.N. resolution stating that breastfeeding is the most beneficial way of feeding a child.

After Adams received a personal diagnosis of type two diabetes in 2016, he adopted a plant-based diet and has since used the office to advocate for Brooklynites to adopt plant-based diets along with encouraging healthier lifestyles. The Office of the Brooklyn Borough President launched a plant-based nutrition page on its website with links to resources encouraging vegan and plant-based lifestyles, as well as printable handouts produced by the borough. Additionally, Adams has also prompted the City Council to pass a resolution called "Ban the Baloney," which aims for schools across the city to stop serving processed meats. He has also been an avid supporter of "Meatless Mondays" in public schools. In 2021, Adams authorized a grant from the borough to SUNY Downstate College of Medicine to establish a plant-based supplemental curriculum.

After a spike in rat complaints, Adams co-hosted a Rat Summit alongside Council Member Robert Cornegy in June 2018 to address the issue of rats throughout the borough. In September 2019, he promoted new traps that lured rats with nuts and seeds before knocking them out and drowning them. He showed a group of reporters one of the traps that had caught rats around Brooklyn Borough Hall. He presented their corpses in an effort to demonstrate the trap's effectiveness. Adams and his team said the traps were more humane than poison because they did not cause the rats to suffer in pain for an extended period. The group "Voters for Animal Rights wrote an open letter to the borough president questioning the usefulness of these traps to achieve their goal and their purported humaneness.

Housing 
To address the displacement of longtime residents by gentrification, Adams has held a series of town halls in Bedford–Stuyvesant and East Flatbush to investigate cases of tenant harassment, and also organized legal clinics in East New York, Prospect Lefferts Gardens, and Sunset Park to provide free legal assistance to tenants.

He stood on the damaged roof of 110 Humboldt Street, a seven-story residential building in the Borinquen Plaza II development in Williamsburg, as he called on Governor Andrew Cuomo to restore $100 million in State funding for New York City Housing Authority (NYCHA) roof repairs.

In June 2018, Adams suggested lowering the height of the Alloy Development's Downtown Brooklyn project, 80 Flatbush, from 986 to 600 feet in order to not disrupt or overwhelm the existing community surrounding the building.

Gentrification
In 2017 when speaking about gentrification, Adams said "Our young people coming in need to understand that they are not the modern-day Christopher Columbus: They did not discover Brooklyn. Brooklyn was here long before they set sail, and if anything they need to be part of the greatness of Brooklyn and add their flavor, but not destroy what we are."

In January 2020, Adams gave a speech at an event in Harlem celebrating Martin Luther King Jr. Day. During the speech, he discussed recent New York City transplants, saying, "Go back to Iowa. You go back to Ohio! New York City belongs to the people that [were] here and made New York City what it is." Earlier in the speech, Adams spoke highly of long-term residents, saying, "You were here before Starbucks. You were here before others came and decided they wanted to be part of this city. Folks are not only hijacking your apartments and displacing your living arrangements, they displace your conversations and say that things that are important to you are no longer important."

A spokeswoman for Mayor Bill de Blasio said, "The mayor doesn't agree with how it was said, but the borough president voiced a very real frustration. We need to improve affordability in this city to ensure New Yorkers can stay in the city they love, but New York City will always be a city for everyone." Adams later clarified that he only took issue with new arrivals who don't engage with longtime residents or their communities.

Public safety 

Adams has criticized the use of excessive force in the arrest of Eric Garner, who died after being placed in a chokehold prohibited by NYPD regulations, and the arrest of postal carrier Glen Grays, who was determined not to have committed any crime or infraction.

After the 2014 killings of NYPD officers Wenjian Liu and Rafael Ramos, he wrote an editorial for the New York Daily News calling on police officers and the community to work with each other to build a relationship of mutual respect.

Together with Manhattan Borough President Gale Brewer and civil rights attorney Norman Siegel, Adams held a series of seven public forums and four Google Hangouts for community residents to share their experiences with the police. The information was used to compile a report, and it was concluded that New York City should work to involve the public in the work of the NYPD, improve training for police officers, and allow independent investigations when police misconduct has been alleged.

Following the school shooting at Marjory Stoneman Douglas High School in Parkland, Florida, on February 14, 2018, he joined the efforts of Brooklyn students by organizing an emergency meeting at Brooklyn Borough Hall and a rally in Prospect Park to demand stricter gun laws. That same month, after a correctional officer endured a beating from six inmates at the George Motchan Detention Center on Rikers Island, Adams stood outside the Brooklyn Detention Center to express his support to reinstate solitary confinement in prisons.

Technology 
Adams formed a partnership with flowthings.io, a Brooklyn-based startup, and Dell to access and collect real-time data on conditions in Brooklyn Borough Hall, with device counters to monitor occupancy in rooms that sometimes experience overcrowding, multi-sensors to determine whether equipment has been operating efficiently, sensors such as smart-strips and smart-plugs to measure energy usage around the building, and ultrasonic rangefinders to identify that ADA-designated entrances are accessible in real-time.

He partnered with tech startup Heat Seek NYC to allow tenants to be able to report conditions in their apartments with sensor hardware and web applications.

Adams opposed efforts to limit the number of new e-hail cars, such as Uber, explaining that such technologies provide opportunities for people of color to find work and travel in their communities.

Parking disputes 
Adams had been criticized during his tenure as Brooklyn Borough President for allowing his staff to abuse official "parking placards," which permit temporary or emergency lifting of parking restrictions for official government business. Critics said that it blocked access to crosswalks and sidewalks by disabled individuals.

At a September 2019 town hall, Adams responded, saying "The only individuals who are allowed to park private vehicles around the building are my women employees that I have told they have to respond late at night when they call."

Other initiatives 
In 2014, Adams established One Brooklyn Fund, a non-profit organization for community programs, grant writing, and extolling local businesses, though it has been criticized as serving as a conduit for his public profile and allowing non-campaign pay to play contributions from developers and lobbyists. Adams' office have been investigated twice by the city Department of Investigation (DOI) over One Brooklyn's fundraising. The first investigation was in 2014 over potential attendees being asked if they were interested in providing "financial support" to One Brooklyn. In 2016, Adams' office was found by the DOI to wrongly license the use of Borough Hall to the Mayor's Office for an event.

Given the success of the brewing industry in Brooklyn, Adams has called for a more lenient Blue Law since October 2017, allowing New York City businesses to start selling alcohol two hours earlier starting at 8a.m.

2021 New York City mayoral campaign 

Adams had long been mulling a run for New York mayor, and on November 17, 2020, he announced his candidacy for Mayor of New York City in the 2021 election. He was a top fundraiser among Democrats in the race, second only to Raymond McGuire in terms of the amount raised.

Adams ran as a moderate Democrat, and his campaign focused on crime and public safety. He has argued against the defund the police movement and in favor of police reform. Public health and the city's economy were cited as his campaign's other top priorities. Initiatives promoted in his campaign include "an expanded local tax credit for low-income families, investment in underperforming schools, and improvements to public housing."

On November 20, 2020, shortly after formally announcing his run for mayor of New York City, Adams attended an indoor fundraiser with 18 people in an Upper West Side restaurant during the COVID-19 pandemic, drawing criticism. He held an already scheduled fundraiser the following day in Queens, when a 25-person limit on mass gatherings was in place. Adams's campaign said that there were eight people at the event and that they were required to wear masks and practice social distancing.

While Adams opposed NYPD's "stop and frisk" policy, during his State Senate tenure, he supported it during his 2021 mayoral campaign. In February 2020, Adams stated that "if you have a police department where you're saying you can't stop and question, that is not a responsible form of policing..." For much of the race, Adams trailed entrepreneur Andrew Yang in public polling. However, Adams's standing in the polls grew stronger in May, and he emerged as the frontrunner in the final weeks of the election. In the months leading up to the election, crime rose in New York, which may have benefited Adams, a former police officer, who ran as a tough-on-crime candidate.

During his run, Adams's residency was questioned by various media outlets. Adams and his partner, Tracey Collins, own a co-op in Bergen County, New Jersey in Fort Lee, New Jersey near the George Washington Bridge, where some critics allege he actually resides.

On July 6, Adams completed a come-from-behind victory and was declared the winner of the Democratic primary, ahead of Kathryn Garcia, Maya Wiley, Andrew Yang and others in New York's first major race to use ranked-choice voting.

Following his primary victory, Adams hosted a series of political fundraisers in The Hamptons and Martha's Vineyard and vacationed in Monte Carlo, which critics contended contradicted his message of being a "blue-collar" mayor.

Adams faced Republican Curtis Sliwa in the general election and was heavily favored to prevail. He was elected on November 2, 2021, winning 67.4% of the vote to Sliwa's 27.9%.

Endorsements 
Adams received support in the primary from New York elected officials including US Representatives Thomas Suozzi, Adriano Espaillat and Sean Patrick Maloney, as well as fellow Borough Presidents Rubén Díaz Jr. from The Bronx and Donovan Richards from Queens, along with a number of city and state legislators. Adams also received endorsements from labor union locals, including the Uniformed Fire Officers Association, District Council 37, and Service Employees International Union, Local 32BJ.

Various local media outlets endorsed Adams, including El Especialito, The Irish Echo, The Jewish Press, New York Post, Our Time Press, and the Queens Chronicle. He was ranked as the second choice in the Democratic primary by the New York Daily News behind Kathryn Garcia.

Mayor of New York City (2022–present)

Mayoral transition

In August 2021, Adams named Sheena Wright, CEO of United Way of New York City as chair of his transition team. In November, Adams named nine additional co-chairs, including CUNY Chancellor Félix Matos Rodríguez, SEIU 32BJ President Kyle Bragg, Goldman Sachs CFO Stephen Scherr, YMCA of Greater New York President and CEO Sharon Greenberger, Infor CEO Charles Phillips, and Ford Foundation President Darren Walker.

After getting elected, Adams reconfirmed his pledge to reinstate a plainclothes police unit that deals with gun violence. Some Black Lives Matter activists denounced the effort, but Adams labeled the behavior "grandstanding".

On November 4, 2021, Adams tweeted that he planned to take his first three paychecks as Mayor in bitcoin and that New York City would be "the center of the cryptocurrency industry and other fast-growing, innovative industries".

Adams announced he would bring back the "gifted and talented" school program, improve relations with New York State, review property taxes, and reduce agency budgets by 3% to 5%.

On December 2, 2021, Adams took a trip to Ghana where he visited the Elmina Castle.

Tenure

Inauguration
Adams took office shortly after the New Year's Eve Ball Drop at midnight in Times Square, holding a picture of his deceased mother, Dorothy, while being sworn in. He became the city's second mayor of African descent to hold the position and the first since David Dinkins left office in 1993.

First 100 days
On his first day in office, Adams rode the New York City Subway to City Hall. On the subway ride, Adams witnessed a street fight and called 9-1-1.

Shortly after becoming mayor, Adams sought a waiver from the Conflicts of Interest Board to hire his brother, Bernard, for a $210,000 paying job in the NYPD where he would serve as his "personal security detail." Bernard started working the job on December 30, 2021, two days before Adams was inaugurated as mayor. Adams was accused of nepotism for this pick. Adams said white supremacy and anarchists are on the rise and "suggested that he can trust no one in the police department as much as he can his own kin." He was also criticized for his hiring of Philip Banks III, a former NYPD commander, to serve as deputy mayor for public safety. Banks had been the subject of a federal investigation by the FBI in 2014, the same year he resigned from the police force.

Eight days into Adams's tenure as Mayor, an apartment fire in the Bronx killed 17 people including eight children. In response to the fire, Adams announced that a law requiring self-closing doors to prevent smoke and fires from spreading throughout apartment buildings would be enforced. However, his administration faced criticism for its slow response in distributing disaster funds to those impacted by the fire.

New York City faced a significant uptick in crime during the first months of Adams's tenure as Mayor. The uptick in crime was highlighted by the shooting deaths of two NYPD officers, Jason Rivera and Wilbert Mora, when responding to a domestic disturbance in Harlem. In response, Adams announced that he would be bringing back a police unit made up of plainclothes officers, which was disbanded by de Blasio in 2020 following the murder of George Floyd. The unit was officially revived on March 16, 2022. In the midst of the crime spree, President Joe Biden and Attorney General Merrick Garland visited New York City and vowed to work with Adams to crack down on homemade firearms, which lack traceable serial numbers and can be acquired without background checks. Throughout Adam's first year in office, crime continued to rise resulting in both The New York Times and the New York Post labeling his plans as "ineffectual."

In early February 2022, a video of Adams from 2019 leaked in which the then-Borough President boasted about being a better cop than his "cracker" colleagues. Adams apologized for his comments, saying, "I apologize not only to those who heard it but to New Yorkers because they should expect more from me and that was inappropriate."

Later in February, Adams implemented a zero-tolerance policy for homeless people sleeping in subway cars or in subway stations. Police officers, assisted by mental health professionals, were tasked with removing homeless people from the subway system and directing them to homeless shelters or mental health hospitals. The plan has been met with criticism from some activists. The Adams administration also took a stand against homeless encampments. In the first three months of Adam's tenure, more than 300 homeless encampments had been declared and cleared. In an effort to track encampments, Adams's administration created a shared Google Doc that NYPD officers are directed to use to report homeless encampments. The Department of Homeless Services is then tasked with responding to such reports within a week.

On February 14, 2022, 1,430 New York City municipal workers were fired after refusing to be vaccinated against COVID-19. The mandate had been introduced in October 2021 by Adams's predecessor, but kept in place by Adams. In March 2022, Adams ended the city's vaccine mandate for indoor setting and city's mask mandate in public school. That same month, Adams announced that he would be keeping the city's vaccine mandate for private-sector employees in place, but would be creating an exemption for athletes and performers. The policy became known as the "Kyrie Carve-Out," as it was intended to allow unvaccinated Brooklyn Nets star Kyrie Irving to play home basketball games.

On February 23, 2022, Adams called on companies based in New York City to rescind remote work policies put in place during the COVID-19 pandemic, saying "you can’t stay home in your pajamas all day." Adams cited the need for in-person workers in the city who would patronize local businesses, saying "I need the accountant in the office, so that they can go to the local restaurant, so that we can make sure that everyone is employed."

Remainder of 2022

On April 11, 2022, Adams was diagnosed with COVID-19 and entered quarantine for 10 days. While Adams was quarantined, a man shot 10 people on a New York City Subway train in Brooklyn. Adams worked virtually to issue a response to the attack, and criticized the national "overproliferation" of guns as being responsible for gun violence. Following the shooting, he suggested the implementation of metal detectors to screen riders entering the subway.

In June 2022, Adams unveiled his administration's "comprehensive blueprint" for affordable housing. However, the plan was critiqued for being too vague as it did not propose rezoning to build more housing, and did not contain any actual estimate of how many new housing units would be built.

In response to an influx of asylum seekers sent to New York City from the states of Florida and Texas, Adams announced plans to install Humanitarian Emergency Response and Relief Center Tent Cities on Randalls Island. After about one month, the tent city was closed and the migrants were moved to hotels in downtown Manhattan.

In late November, as part of his campaign to combat crime and clear homeless encampments in New York City, Adams announced an effort to allow the police to involuntarily commit mentally ill people to psychiatric institutions. The policy states those hospitalized should only be discharged once they are stable and connected to ongoing care. The policy will be enforced by police, care workers and medical officials, who will be tasked with identifying those who are mentally ill and who are unable to care for themselves. The policy applies to those who pose no direct danger to themselves or others.

In December 2022, Adams, Reverends Al Sharpton and Conrad Tillard, Vista Equity Partners CEO and Carnegie Hall Chairman Robert F. Smith, World Values Network founder and CEO Rabbi Shmuley Boteach, and Elisha Wiesel joined to host 15 Days of Light, celebrating Hanukkah and Kwanzaa in a unifying holiday ceremony at Carnegie Hall. Adams said: "social media is having a major impact on the hatred that we are seeing in our city and in this country.... We should bring social media companies to the table to highlight the racist and antisemitic words being spread on their platforms." 

Polls conducted shortly after Adams' inauguration found that he had a 63% approval rating. On June 7, 2022, a poll conducted by Siena College, in conjunction with Spectrum News and its NY1 affiliate, found Adams had an approval rating of 29%. The poll also found 76% of New Yorkers worried they could be a victim of a violent crime.

2023
In late February 2023, at the annual interfaith breakfast, Adams said that he disagrees with the notion of separation of church and state. During the speech Adams said "don’t tell me about no separation of church and state. State is the body. Church is the heart. You take the heart out of the body, the body dies." Additionally, Adams said he disagreed with the Supreme Court's 1962 decision in Engel v. Vitale, which held school prayer to be unconstitutional. Adams said "when we took prayers out of schools, guns came into schools..."

Electoral history

Personal life
Adams has never been married, but has a son, Jordan Coleman, with former girlfriend Chrisena Coleman. His son is a graduate of American University, and is a filmmaker and television actor. Adams is currently in a relationship with Tracey Collins, the Senior Youth Development Director for the New York City Department of Education. Adams has earned the nickname "Nightlife Mayor" due to his penchant for frequently clubbing in the city on Friday and Saturday nights.

Adams is a non-denominational Christian.

Plant-based diet
In 2016, Adams became a vegan after his diagnosis of type 2 diabetes. Adams researched alternatives to lifelong insulin injections and sought opinions of physicians including Dr. Caldwell B. Esselstyn Jr. of the Cleveland Clinic. Adams made lifestyle changes rather than pursuing traditional treatments for diabetes. He switched to a whole food plant-based diet, removing animal products, processed sugar, salt, oil and processed starches. He also began exercising regularly, including using an exercise bike and treadmill in his office. Within six months, he lost , reversed his diabetes, and reduced his blood pressure and cholesterol levels. He has stated that he wants to encourage others to switch to a healthier diet and that public health spending for diabetes should go towards lifestyle changes rather than treating disease. In February 2022, after several accounts of Adams eating fish in public surfaced, questions emerged about whether Adams was truly a vegan. In response, he stated that while he follows a plant-based diet, "I am perfectly imperfect, and have occasionally eaten fish."

In October 2020, Adams published the plant-based advocacy cookbook, Healthy at Last: A Plant-Based Approach to Preventing and Reversing Diabetes and Other Chronic Illnesses, which also chronicles his own health journey. He is also a contributor to the 2021 anthology Brotha Vegan: Black Men Speak on Food, Identity, Health, and Society.

Bibliography

References

External links

 Government website
 Campaign website
 New York State Senate profile (archived)
 

Healthy at Last: The Eric Adams Story, The Exam Room Podcast, Physicians Committee for Responsible Medicine, September 24, 2020.

 
1960 births
20th-century African-American politicians
African-American men in politics
20th-century American politicians
21st-century African-American writers
21st-century American male writers
21st-century American non-fiction writers
21st-century American politicians
African-American male writers
African-American mayors in New York (state)
African-American police officers
African-American state legislators in New York (state)
American male non-fiction writers
Bayside High School (Queens) alumni
Brooklyn borough presidents
Candidates in the 1994 United States elections
Illeists
John Jay College of Criminal Justice alumni
Living people
Marist College alumni
Mayors of New York City
New York (state) Democrats
New York (state) Republicans
New York (state) state senators
New York City Police Department officers
People from Bushwick, Brooklyn
Politicians with dyslexia
Plant-based diet advocates
Politicians from Brooklyn
American veganism activists
American Christians